TNT Limited may refer to:

Thomas Nationwide Transport, Australian logistics operator that traded as TNT Limited between 1986 and 1996
Legal entity behind TNT Express in the United Kingdom